{{DISPLAYTITLE:C15H23N5O2S}}
The molecular formula C15H23N5O2S (molar mass: 337.440 g/mol, exact mass: 337.1572 u) may refer to:

 GS-39783
 Oclacitinib

Molecular formulas